The 2023 Nigerian presidential election in Taraba State will be held on 25 February 2023 as part of the nationwide 2023 Nigerian presidential election to elect the president and vice president of Nigeria. Other federal elections, including elections to the House of Representatives and the Senate, will also be held on the same date while state elections will be held two weeks afterward on 11 March.

Background
Taraba State is a diverse, agriculture-based state in the Middle Belt that has faced challenges in security as inter-ethnic violence and conflict between herders and farmers heavily affect the region. The overproliferation of weaponry and increased pressure for land along with failures in governance led to the worsening of these clashes in the years ahead of the election.

Politically, the 2019 elections were a mixed bag for both major parties. On the federal level, PDP presidential nominee Atiku Abubakar narrowly won the state by 7% but it swung slightly towards Buhari; legislatively, the parties fairly evenly split the Senate seats and House of Representatives seats. Statewise, Ishaku won re-election by a wide margin and the PDP won a majority in the House of Assembly.

Polling

Projections

General election

Results

By senatorial district 
The results of the election by senatorial district.

By federal constituency
The results of the election by federal constituency.

By local government area 
The results of the election by local government area.

See also 
 2023 Nigerian elections
 2023 Nigerian presidential election

Notes

References 

Taraba State gubernatorial election
2023 Taraba State elections
Taraba